Pallamiaki is a Greek association football club formed on 14 March 1928 and based on Lamia. Its colours are yellow and black.

The team reached the Greek second division's central group in the 1959–60 season and was ranked 6th. A year later (1960-61 season), they finished 4th in the same group. and in the 1962–63 season Pallamiaki finished 10th in Group 4 of Beta Ethniki, narrowly escaping relegation by better goal difference.

In summer 1963, Pallamiakos and Olympiacos Lamia were merged to form Lamiakos, which was renamed to Lamia F.C. in 1964.

Titles
Total: 10 (championship), 4 (cup)
Fthiotida and Fokida FCA: 9 (championship), 2 (cup)
Championship: 1955, 1957, 1959, 1960, 1961, 1964, 1978, 1980, 1983
Cup: 1979, 1983
Fthiotida FCA: 1 (championship), 2 (cup)
Championship: 1988
Cup: 1986, 1987

References

Sport in Phthiotis
Association football clubs established in 1928
Football clubs in Central Greece
1928 establishments in Greece
Lamia (city)